Thoughts on the True Estimation of Living Forces is Immanuel Kant's first published work. 

Written in 1744–46 and published in 1747, it reflected Kant's position as a metaphysical dualist at the time. In it he argues against the vis motrix ("moving force") view supported by Wolff and other post-Leibnizian German rationalists that proposed that bodies have no essential force, and claimed that, instead, the existence of an essential force can be proven by metaphysical arguments. Kant criticized Leibniz's followers for looking "no further than the senses teach," and stayed close to Leibniz's original vis activa ("active force"; also known as vis viva, "living force") point of view.

Notes

References
 Carpenter, Andrew N.,   "Review of The Philosophy of the Young Kant: The Precritical Project." Kantian Review 5: 147–153.

External links
 Online version of the text

1749 books
Books by Immanuel Kant
German non-fiction books